Hardtbach may refer to:

 Hardtbach (Rhine), a river of North Rhine-Westphalia, Germany, left tributary of the Rhine
 Hardtbach, a small river of North Rhine-Westphalia, Germany, left tributary of the Wupper